Michael Holt (born 1929) is a UK author of puzzle and quiz books for children, including several Doctor Who related quiz books and Crisis In Space in the Make Your Own Adventure with Doctor Who series. He was also the co-author of Puffin Books' Big Book of Puzzles series. He taught mathematics and geometry in London schools in the 1960s and 1970s.

References

Living people
1929 births
Date of birth missing (living people)